August Wilson (March 1, 1864 – ?) was a United States Navy sailor and a recipient of the United States military's highest decoration, the Medal of Honor.

Biography
Wilson was born March 1, 1864, in Danzig, Prussia and emigrated to the U.S., joining the Navy from New York state. On July 1, 1897, he was serving as a boilermaker on the  when one of the crown sheets collapsed on boiler E. He entered the fireroom after wrapping wet cloths around his face and arms to protect him from the heat and flames. Once in the fireroom he opened the safety valve to prevent the other boilers from being damaged or destroyed. For his actions he received the Medal of Honor.

Medal of Honor citation
Rank and organization: Boilermaker, U.S. Navy. Born: 1 March 1864, Danzig, Germany. Accredited to: New York. G.O. No.. 482, November 1897.

Citation: 

For gallant conduct while serving on board the U.S.S. Puritan and at the time of the collapse of one of the crown sheets of boiler E on that vessel, 1 July 1897. Wrapping wet cloths about his face and arms, Wilson entered the fireroom and opened the safety valve, thus removing the danger of disabling the other boilers.

See also
List of Medal of Honor recipients in non-combat incidents

References

External links

1864 births
Year of death missing
German emigrants to the United States
United States Navy sailors
United States Navy Medal of Honor recipients
German-born Medal of Honor recipients
American boilermakers
Non-combat recipients of the Medal of Honor
Military personnel from Gdańsk